Leonard Napoleon Boston (1871–1931) was an American physician remembered for describing Boston's sign.

Biography 
Leonard Boston was born in 1871 in Philadelphia, and graduated with an M.D. in 1896 from the Medico-Chirurgical College of Philadelphia. He became Professor of Physical Diagnosis in 1912, and then Associate Professor of Medicine at the University of Pennsylvania in 1919. He became Professor of Principles and Practice of Medicine at the Women's Medical College of Pennsylvania in 1928. He died from erysipelas in 1931.

References 

1871 births
1931 deaths
Physicians from Philadelphia
University of Pennsylvania faculty
Perelman School of Medicine at the University of Pennsylvania alumni
Deaths from skin disease